Lighthouse is the third studio album by Russian chamber progressive band iamthemorning. It was released on 1 April 2016 through Kscope. It features several guest musicians, including Gavin Harrison and Colin Edwin from Porcupine Tree, as well as Mariusz Duda from Riverside.

The album was primarily recorded at Murder Mile Studios in London and Mosfilm Studios in Moscow, mixed at Murder Mile Studio, mastered by Marcel van Limbeek and Neil Pickles at Reveal Sound Studios in London and produced by iamthemorning. The album was premiered by AllMusic on 30 March 2016.

Reception 

The album was positively received by critics, with favorable reviews and complimentary comments from specialized music sites such as AllMusic, the indie music site Echoes and Dust, or the UK metal blog The Metalist.

AllMusic gave the album a 4 out of 5 score, and Thom Jurek's review emphasizes that while "The music on Lighthouse is more restrained than on earlier albums ... The control executed over pace, narrative, and arrangements is remarkably consistent and strong, making the set an inseparable whole...", and then concludes that "Despite referencing sounds familiar to many, this piano-and-vocal duo carve out a persona that's unmistakably their own."

On 1 September Lighthouse won album of the year at TeamRock's 2016 Progressive Music Awards.

Track listing

Personnel

iamthemorning
 Gleb Kolyadin - grand piano, keyboards 
 Marjana Semkina - lead and backing vocals

Guest musicians
 Gavin Harrison - drums 
 Colin Edwin - bass 
 Vlad Avy - guitars 
 Evan Carson - bodhrán and percussion 
 Andres Izmailov - harp
 Tatiana Rezetdinova - flute 
 Roman Erofeev - clarinet 
 Sergey Korolkov - trumpet 
 Oksana Stepanova - bombard
 Philipp Saulin - violin 
 Mikhail Ignatov - cello  
 Mariusz Duda - vocals

Production 
 Marcel van Limbeek - mixing, mastering

 Gianluca Capacchione - mixing
 Vlad Avy - mixing
 Neil Pickles - mixing, mastering
 Constantine Nagishkin - artwork
 Mikhail Meerov - design

Strings Ensemble
 Violins: Anastasia Razumets, Aleksandra Svidunovich, Zhuldyz Bukina, Tatiana Kuvaitseva, Philipp Saulin 
 Violas: Aleksander Bogdanovich, Ksenia Ivanova
 Cellos: Mikhail Ignatov, Evgenia Ignatova
 Double bass: Alexander Kuznetcov

"Perezvony" Choir (featured on Sleeping pills)
 Larisa Yarutskaya - conductor and art-director 
Stanislava Sorokina, Svetlana Utkina, Yury Volkov, Maria Cherepanova, Elizaveta Levina, Anastasia Andriyanenko, Daria Severinova, Alina Vahrina, Anastasia Kavalerova, Nikol Zgeib, Anna Sokolova, Anastasia Malova, Sofia Liberman, Margarita Raspopova, Martin Sadomirsky, Svetlana Philippova, Serafima Chervotkina

References 

2016 albums
Iamthemorning albums
Kscope albums